Phosphorylase b kinase regulatory subunit beta is an enzyme that in humans is encoded by the PHKB gene.

References

Further reading

External links
  GeneReviews/NCBI/NIH/UW entry on Phosphorylase Kinase Deficiency, Glycogen Storage Disease Type IX

EC 2.7.11